Matthew Armstrong (12 November 1911 – 4 October 1995) was a professional footballer who played as a striker for Aberdeen and Queen of the South.

Career

Armstrong was born in Newton Stewart and played for Port Glasgow Athletic Juniors before signing for Aberdeen in 1931. His career was interrupted by World War II in 1939 and, after a brief return to Aberdeen, he signed for Queen of the South in the 1946–47 season. He later played for Elgin City and Peterhead before retiring in 1951.

Armstrong won three caps with the Scotland national team.

Career statistics

Club 

*Games played before league season was suspended

International

References

External links
 

1911 births
1995 deaths
Scottish footballers
People from Newton Stewart
Footballers from Dumfries and Galloway
Aberdeen F.C. players
Queen of the South F.C. players
Highland Football League players
Elgin City F.C. players
Peterhead F.C. players
Scottish Football League players
Scotland international footballers
Scottish Football League representative players
Clapton Orient F.C. wartime guest players
Brentford F.C. wartime guest players
Association football forwards
Port Glasgow Athletic Juniors F.C. players
Scottish Junior Football Association players
Scotland junior international footballers